Legislative elections were held in Macau on 3 October 1996.

Results

Members
Geographical constituency (8 seats)
Association for Promoting the Economy of Macau: Chan Kai Kit (12,029) and Liu Yuk Lun (6,014)
Union for Promoting Progress: Leong Heng Teng (11,045) and Kou Hoi In (5,522)
Union for Development: Tong Chi Kin (10,525)
General Union for the Good of Macau@ Fong Chi Keong (7,516)
Convergence for Development: David Chow (7,439)
New Democratic Macau Association: António Ng (6,331)

Functional constituencies (8 seats)
OMKC Group (representing business) – Edmund Ho (replaced by Chui Sai Cheong in 1999). Vitor Ng, Hoi Sai Iun, and Susana Chou
CCCAE Group (representing labor) – Lau Cheok Va and Kwan Tsui Hang
OMCY Group (representing professional) – Leonel Alberto Alves
DCAR Group (representing welfare, cultural, educational and sports interests) – Anabela Fátima Xavier Sales Ritchie

Nominated members (7 seats)
José João de Deus Rodrigues do Rosário
Raimundo Arrais do Rosário
Joaquim Morais Alves
Joaquim Jorge Perestrelo Neto Valente
José Manuel de Oliveira Rodrigues
António José Félix Pontes
Rui António Craveiro Afonso

References

Elections in Macau
Macau
Legislative